Burak Mert (born 23 October 1990) is a Turkish male volleyball player. He is part of the Turkey men's national volleyball team. On club level he plays for Fenerbahçe.

External links
 profile at FIVB.org
 Player profile at Volleybox.net

1990 births
Living people
Turkish men's volleyball players
Place of birth missing (living people)
Volleyball players at the 2015 European Games
European Games competitors for Turkey
Competitors at the 2018 Mediterranean Games
Galatasaray S.K. (men's volleyball) players
İstanbul Büyükşehir Belediyespor volleyballers
Arkas Spor volleyball players
Mediterranean Games competitors for Turkey
21st-century Turkish people